David Lloyd (1 June 1928 – 2000) was an English professional footballer who played as a striker in the Football League for York City, and was on the books of Sunderland and Sheffield United without making a league appearance.

References

1928 births
Footballers from Gateshead
2000 deaths
English footballers
Association football forwards
Sunderland A.F.C. players
Sheffield United F.C. players
York City F.C. players
English Football League players